The 2020 Indonesia Masters (officially known as the Daihatsu Indonesia Masters 2020 for sponsorship reasons) was a badminton tournament that took place at the Istora Gelora Bung Karno in Indonesia from 14 to 19 January 2020 and had a total purse of $400,000.

Tournament
The 2020 Indonesia Masters was the second tournament of the 2020 BWF World Tour and also part of the Indonesia Masters championships, which had been held since 2010. This tournament was organized by the Badminton Association of Indonesia with sanction from the BWF.

Venue
This international tournament was held at the Istora Gelora Bung Karno in Jakarta, Indonesia.

Point distribution
Below is the point distribution for each phase of the tournament based on the BWF points system for the BWF World Tour Super 500 event.

Prize money
The total prize money for this tournament was US$400,000. Distribution of prize money was in accordance with BWF regulations.

Men's singles

Seeds

 Kento Momota (withdrew)
 Chou Tien-chen (first round)
 Chen Long (withdrew)
 Anders Antonsen (final)
 Viktor Axelsen (semi-finals)
 Jonatan Christie (quarter-finals)
 Anthony Sinisuka Ginting (champion)
 Shi Yuqi (quarter-finals)

Finals

Top half

Section 1

Section 2

Bottom half

Section 3

Section 4

Women's singles

Seeds

 Chen Yufei (first round)
 Akane Yamaguchi (second round)
 Nozomi Okuhara (second round)
 Ratchanok Intanon (champion)
 P. V. Sindhu (second round)
 He Bingjiao (semi-finals)
 Michelle Li (quarter-finals)
 An Se-young (quarter-finals)

Finals

Top half

Section 1

Section 2

Bottom half

Section 3

Section 4

Men's doubles

Seeds

 Marcus Fernaldi Gideon / Kevin Sanjaya Sukamuljo (champions)
 Mohammad Ahsan / Hendra Setiawan (final)
 Takeshi Kamura / Keigo Sonoda (withdrew)
 Li Junhui / Liu Yuchen (first round)
 Fajar Alfian / Muhammad Rian Ardianto (semi-finals)
 Hiroyuki Endo / Yuta Watanabe (withdrew)
 Lee Yang / Wang Chi-lin (quarter-finals)
 Aaron Chia / Soh Wooi Yik (semi-finals)

Finals

Top half

Section 1

Section 2

Bottom half

Section 3

Section 4

Women's doubles

Seeds

 Chen Qingchen / Jia Yifan (second round)
 Yuki Fukushima / Sayaka Hirota (second round)
 Mayu Matsumoto / Wakana Nagahara (second round)
 Misaki Matsutomo / Ayaka Takahashi (semi-finals)
 Kim So-yeong / Kong Hee-yong (semi-finals)
 Lee So-hee / Shin Seung-chan (quarter-finals)
 Du Yue / Li Yinhui (second round)
 Greysia Polii / Apriyani Rahayu (champions)

Finals

Top half

Section 1

Section 2

Bottom half

Section 3

Section 4

Mixed doubles

Seeds

 Zheng Siwei / Huang Yaqiong (champions)
 Wang Yilyu / Huang Dongping (final)
 Yuta Watanabe / Arisa Higashino (withdrew)
 Dechapol Puavaranukroh / Sapsiree Taerattanachai (second round)
 Praveen Jordan / Melati Daeva Oktavianti (quarter-finals)
 Chan Peng Soon / Goh Liu Ying (quarter-finals)
 Seo Seung-jae / Chae Yoo-jung (first round)
 Goh Soon Huat / Shevon Jemie Lai (second round)

Finals

Top half

Section 1

Section 2

Bottom half

Section 3

Section 4

References

External links
 Tournament Link

Indonesian Masters (badminton)
Indonesia Masters
Indonesia Masters (badminton)
Indonesia Masters (badminton)